Wolfgang von Graben, also Wolfgang de Groben (de Gröben) and Wolfgang Grabenski (1465 – 11 December 1521) was born in Kornberg castle, Styria and a member of the Austrian nobility. He held the titles as a Lord of Graben,  Kornberg, the Lordship Marburg with Obermarburg and Maribor Castle, Radkersburg, Neudenstein, Weinberg and Viscount of Saldenhofen.

Biography 
Wolfgang was a descendant of the Herren von Graben family, who descend from the Meinhardiner dynasty. His parents were Ulrich III von Graben and Agnes Närringer. Virgil von Graben was his cousin.

He was first named in 1470 as heritage Jörg II Steinwalds of some manors of 30 styrian Stubenberg fiefs. In 1481 Fredericks III of Austria pledged him castle Gurnitz.

In 1483 Von Graben moved to Holland where he married and from whom the sons Pieter and Abraham were born; both sons called Graeff resp. Op den Graeff. (De) Graeff was the Dutch spelling of Von Graben in the 14 and 15th century. Pieter Graeff (married Griet Pietersdr Berents from the "Berents-De Grebber family"), who became the ancestor of the Dutch Graeff/De Graeff family. In the Diploma of Nobility from 19 July 1677 loaned to Andries de Graeff, it was affirmed that the family de Graeff was formerly called von Graben, which is the same as de Graeff. This family today shows the same coat of arms as the De Graeff family.

Returning to Austria in 1485, Wolfgang became one of the emperor Fredericks mayor captains in the war against Matthias Corvinus.

In 1489 Von Graben succeeded his father as lord of Marburg, castle Obermarburg and the citypalace Marburg an der Drau. In the following year he succeeded his cousin Georg Breuner as lord of some smaller styrian and imperial fiefs. In the same year he was in of castle Neidenstein.

Later he became burggraf of Saldenhofen (1498), bailiff of Bad Radkersburg and Tabor (since 1501) and since 1510 as successor of his brother Andre von Graben of Slovenj Gradec (Windischgraetz).

In 1509 he was made advisor to Emperor Maximilian I of Austria.

In 1520 he inherited together with his brothers Andre and Wilhelm von Graben Schloss Graben near Novo Mesto (Rudolfswerth) in Carniola.

Descendants of Wolfgang von Graben 
 

During the Dutch Golden Age the Amsterdam (de) Graeff family said that they descend from Wolfgang von Graben, who was in Holland in 1483. In the Diploma of Nobility from July 19th, 1677 loaned to Andries de Graeff and his son Cornelis de Graeff it was affirmed that the family De Graeff was formerly called von Graben.

Fide digis itegur genealogistarum Amsteldamensium edocti testimoniis te Andream de Graeff [Andries de Graeff] non paternum solum ex pervetusta in Comitatu nostro Tyrolensi von Graben dicta familia originem ducere, qua olim per quendam ex ascendentibus tuis ejus nominis in Belgium traducta et in Petrum de Graeff [Pieter Graeff], abavum, Johannem [Jan Pietersz Graeff], proavum, Theodorum [Dirck Jansz Graeff], avum, ac tandem Jacobum [Jacob Dircksz de Graeff], patrem tuum, viros in civitate, Amstelodamensi continua serie consulatum scabinatus senatorii ordinis dignitabitus conspicuos et in publicum bene semper meritos propagata nobiliter et cum splendore inter suos se semper gessaerit interque alios honores praerogativasque nobilibus eo locorum proprias liberum venandi jus in Hollandia, Frisiaque occidentale ac Ultrajectina provinciis habuerit semper et exercuerit.

Notes

External link 

1465 births
1521 deaths
People from Styria
Medieval Austrian nobility
15th-century Austrian people
16th-century Austrian people